Mainfreight Limited is a New Zealand logistics and transport company headquartered in Auckland. Mainfreight commenced operations in Auckland in 1978 and is the largest freight company in New Zealand. It has been listed on the New Zealand Exchange since 1996.

History
Mainfreight was founded on 6 March 1978 by Bruce Plested who started the company with just $7,200 and a 1969 Bedford truck. In 1979, Bruce Plested partnered with Neil Graham, with Graham based in Christchurch and Plested in Auckland.

When the company was founded it entered a highly regulated transport market. A licence from New Zealand Railways Corporation was needed to carry freight over 150 km. When deregulation of land transport occurred in October 1982, Mainfreight quickly took advantage of the opportunities presented and won a large share of the freight market. Whilst describing the foundation of Mainfreight in 2000, Plested said to the New Zealand Herald, "We moved all our freight by sea between Auckland, and Christchurch and Dunedin, and we worked weekend shifts to make sure we loaded and unloaded the ship using the whole of the seven days - we found that was faster and more reliable than our big competitors."

Subsidiaries

Mainfreight Australia
The firm's Australian domestic freight and logistics division, Mainfreight Distribution, began operations in 1989, with an operation in Sydney. This operation was expanded with depots in Melbourne and Brisbane. It now has 22 company depots in Australia and relies on agents and third parties in the Northern Territory, Tasmania and some of regional Australia.

Mainfreight International
Mainfreight International was Mainfreight's first international sea and airfreight business and was started in 1984 by Bruce Plested's brother Gerald. They established agencies in the early days with Australian, Pacific Island and United States freight forwarders and the established agents in most major trading partner countries of New Zealand.

Mainfreight USA
Mainfreight has international operations in the United States through CaroTrans International and most recently Mainfreight International businesses after the 2007 acquisition of Target Logistics, in Asia (nine branches in China, one each in Taiwan, Singapore and Hong Kong). In 2007, Mainfreight acquired Target Logistics, a United States based forwarder with 34 offices, and an extensive agent network. In 2008, the United States locations were re-branded as Mainfreight USA.

Mainfreight Asia
After the full acquisition that took place August 2007, Mainfreight Asia quickly gained momentum in the Air and Ocean sector, driving business in China and Southeast Asia. With well-established locations that include China, Hong Kong, Taiwan, Malaysia, Thailand, Vietnam, Singapore, Japan and Korea, the Mainfreight global network continues to expand year over year. Mainfreight’s newest regions, Asia, Europe and The Americas (spanning from Canada to South America), are expected to grow exponentially as the world trade shifts towards other developing countries.

Acquisitions

Halford International
On 11 June 2007, Mainfreight 'signed a call option deed' to purchase the entirety of the shares of Australian-based Halford International. Formerly Halford Young, Halford is a private logistics company and freight forwarder with operations and networks in Australia and New Zealand, Japan, Germany, throughout Asia and the United States.

Owens Group
In 2003 Mainfreight bought Owens Group, one of New Zealand's largest trucking firms. This takeover was in response to the purchase of Tranz Rail by Australian transport firm Toll Holdings. With the takeover of the Owens Group in 2003 they purchased Owens International Australia. In 2006 the New Zealand Mainfreight International and Owens International businesses were also merged to make Mainfreight Owens International Ltd (now Mainfreight International).

Wim Bosman Group
In March 2011, Mainfreight entered the European market with the acquisition of Netherlands-based company Wim Bosman Group for €120 million; or $227 million.

Headquartered in 's-Heerenberg, The Netherlands, Wim Bosman is privately held and operates more than 1,000 transport units, manage more than 275,000m2 of cross-docking facilities and warehouse area, and employ roughly 1,414 staff within 14 branches located in The Netherlands, Belgium, France, Romania, Poland, and Russia.

Within its announcement, the Mainfreight sad, "Wim Bosman is a well respected, profitable organisation which will provide Mainfreight with a significant European presence and opportunity to further grow its supply chain logistic services throughout the world."

In June 2013, Mainfreight launched a lawsuit seeking €11 million or $18 million against Wim Bosman Group's former owners. The lawsuit claimed that Wim Bosman, the former owner, had prior knowledge of a large client, Giant Bicycles, intentions to end corporate ties with the group. In August 2013, Mainfreight and the family of Wim Bosman reached an out of court agreement for compensation to the tune of €8.2 million or $14 million.

Since 2011, Mainfreight, under the Wim Bosman name, have opened new branches in Bergen op Zoom in The Netherlands, Cluj-Napoca in Romania, Frankfurt and Gelsenkirchen in Germany, London in United Kingdom, and Poznań/Luboń in Poland. Mainfreight also renamed Wim Bosman branches in the countries France, Poland, Russia and Ukraine under the Mainfreight name.

Others

Lep New Zealand
Between 1994 and 1997 Mainfreight started acquiring former competitors, such as, Daily Freightways and Chem Couriers in 1994, a 75% shareholding in Lep New Zealand in 1996, and Combined Haulage and Senco Haulage in 1997. In 1998, Mainfreight acquired Australian freight forwarder ISS Express lines, subsequently establishing an Australian international freight business.

In April 2007, Mainfreight announced its intentions to sell its Pan Orient Project Logistics business and its 75% interest in Lep Australia and New Zealand to global logistics company Agility Group for A$83 million. The transaction was completed on 6 June 2007.

Target Logistics
In September 2007, it was reported by Business Wire that Mainfreight had signed a merger agreement with NYSE American-listed Target Logistics for $2.50 a share; for a total of US$54 million. Target operate domestic and international time-sensitive freight-forwarding and logistics services through its wholly owned subsidiary, Target Logistic Services. Target has offices in 35 cities throughout the United States and an international network of agents in over 70 countries.

CaroTrans South America
In May 2011, Mainfreight established a CaroTrans branch in Santiago, Chile. This endeavor launched the first permanent investment into South America. In 2020, CaroTrans Chile was re-branded as Mainfreight Chile.

DCB International
In November 2014, Mainfreight acquired a regional air and sea freight company located in Dunedin. Founded in 1969 as Dunedin Customs Brokers Ltd, DCB International provides international air and sea freight services from Dunedin. DCB had a staff base of five employees on the date of acquisition, however, staff was expected to rise to seven employees.

References

External links
Mainfreight website

Companies based in Auckland
Companies listed on the New Zealand Exchange
Road transport in New Zealand
Transport companies established in 1978
Transport companies of New Zealand
1978 establishments in New Zealand